Beatty-Corbett House is a historic plantation house located near Ivanhoe, in Pender County and Sampson County, North Carolina. The house is built at the junction of the Sampson, Pender, and Bladen county lines, the house itself is located in Pender County.  A two-story, side-hall Greek Revival style block was built about 1850, with a two-story, five bay, double pile Classical Revival house added about 1900, and a two-room ell added about 1920.  The central bay of the c. 1900 section features a two-story portico.  Also on the property are the contributing round-notched log stable, smokehouse, tool shed, washhouse, a sulfur spring, tobacco barn, several sections of ornate cast iron fence, the site of former turpentine still, the site of former riverboat landing (Beatty's Landing), and the site of former cotton gin.

It was listed on the National Register of Historic Places in 1986.

References

Plantation houses in North Carolina
Houses on the National Register of Historic Places in North Carolina
Neoclassical architecture in North Carolina
Greek Revival houses in North Carolina
Houses completed in 1850
Houses in Pender County, North Carolina
National Register of Historic Places in Pender County, North Carolina
Houses in Sampson County, North Carolina
National Register of Historic Places in Sampson County, North Carolina